Adamantas (older form Αδάμας, from the Greek αδάμας adamas 'diamond') is the harbor town of Milos island. It has a population of 1,347 people (2011).

Highlights include the French cemetery, used in the years of the Crimean war; the 600-year-old church of the Holy Trinity; the Milos Mining Museum; and the Maritime Museum.

Adamantas is the cultural and commercial center of the island.

References

Populated places in Milos (regional unit)
Milos